Fantasia is the eleventh (11th) studio album by Puerto Rican singer Yolandita Monge. It was the first release of the singer under her recording contract with the international label CBS Records, now Sony Music Latin.  This album was released in 1980 and includes the radio hits "Tanto Amor", "Como Lo Hago Yo", and "Al Ritmo De la Fantasía".

It was re-issued on CD format in 1992 and is currently out of print in all formats. Several hits songs appear in various compilations of the singer available as digital downloads at iTunes and Amazon.

Track listing

Credits and personnel

Vocals: Yolandita Monge
Musical Direction & Arrangements: Héctor Garrido
Recording Engineers: Eddie Trabanco, Vern Carlson, Jack Sherdel
Mixing Engineer: Jack Sherdel
Editorial: Costa Brava Music, Inc. (BMI)
Photography: Joche Dávila
Make-up: Gary Bernford
Stylist: Max
Art: Drago

Notes
Track listing and credits from album cover.
Released in Cassette Format on 1986 (DKC-10468).
Released in CD Format (Serie De Oro) on 1992 (CDB-80745).

References

Yolandita Monge albums
1980 albums